The Hoti cabinet was formed in Kosovo on 3 June 2020 following a deal between the political parties Democratic League of Kosovo, Alliance for the Future of Kosovo, Social Democratic Initiative, New Kosovo Alliance and Serb List.

Actions 
On 30 April 2020, the President of Kosovo Hashim Thaçi said he has handed Avdullah Hoti a mandate to form a government after the Kurti cabinet collapsed in a no-confidence vote in parliament last month.
On 1 May 2020 the Constitutional Court has suspended the implementation of Decree of the President until 29 May 2020.
On 28 May 2020 the Constitutional Court assessed that the President has acted in accordance with Article 82, paragraph 2, of the Constitution on the occasion of the mandate of Avdullah Hoti as Prime Minister

On 3 June 2020, Hoti was elected Prime Minister with 61 votes in favor, 24 against and 1 abstains.

On 21 December 2020, The Constitutional Court has concluded that the vote of the MP, Etem Arifi, in favor of the creation of the Hoti Government, has been invalid. As a result, Kosovo must go to snap elections and the Hoti government is now a caretaker one until the elections are held.

Composition
The cabinet consists of the following Ministers:

References 

Cabinets established in 2020
Cabinets disestablished in 2021
2020 establishments in Kosovo
2021 disestablishments in Kosovo